En plats i solen is the third studio album by Swedish dansband Grönwalls. It was released on 24 November 1994.

Track listing
Jag tror på kärleken
Ett liv tillsammans
Du är min hjärtevän
Vindarnas melodi
En evig sommar
Klackarna i taket
En plats i solen
Ett album av mitt liv
Radio
Tidvattensböljor
Har du sett stjärnorna
Jag har fått nog av dig
Don't Touch Me
Finns det någon bättre än du
Kärlekens språk

References 

1994 albums
Grönwalls albums
Swedish-language albums